Croixsyde is a historic house in May Township, Minnesota, United States, near the city of Stillwater.  It was built from 1922 to 1927 as one of the first summer homes on the St. Croix River.  It was listed on the National Register of Historic Places as the Benjamin B. Sheffield House in 1980 for its local significance in the themes of architecture and entertainment/recreation.  It was nominated for being an early example of the area's summer homes and for its fine rustic architecture.

See also
 National Register of Historic Places listings in Washington County, Minnesota

References

1927 establishments in Minnesota
Houses completed in 1927
Houses in Washington County, Minnesota
Houses on the National Register of Historic Places in Minnesota
Log buildings and structures on the National Register of Historic Places in Minnesota
Log cabins in the United States
National Register of Historic Places in Washington County, Minnesota
Rustic architecture in Minnesota